{{Speciesbox
| image = Babylonia areolata 01.JPG
| image_caption = Five views of a shell of Babylonia areolata
| genus = Babylonia
| species = areolata
| authority = (Link, 1807) 
| synonyms_ref = 
| synonyms =
 Babylonia areolata f. austraoceanensis Lan, 1997
 Babylonia lani Gittenberger & Goud, 2003
 Babylonia magnifica Fraussen & Stratmann, 2005
 Babylonia tessellata (Swainson, 1823)
 Buccinum areolatum Link, 1807 (original combination) Buccinum maculosum Röding, 1798 (Invalid: junior homonym of Buccinum maculosum Martyn, 1784)
 Eburna chemnitziana Fischer von Waldheim, 1807 Eburna tessellata Swainson, 1823
}}Babylonia areolata is a species of sea snail, a marine gastropod mollusc in the family Babyloniidae.

Description
 
Brown sections over a white shell.

Distribution
This marine species occurs from off Taiwan to the Indian Ocean.

References

 Fraussen K. & Stratmann D. (2013) The family Babyloniidae.'' In: G.T. Poppe & K. Groh (eds), A conchological iconography. Harxheim: Conchbooks. 96 pp., pls 1–48.

External links

Babyloniidae
Gastropods described in 1807